"Don't Explain" is a song written by jazz singer Billie Holiday and Arthur Herzog Jr. It was Billie Holiday’s final song.

Overview
In her 1956 autobiography, Holiday cites the infidelity of her first husband, Jimmy Monroe, as the inspiration for this song; specifically, an instance in which Monroe's woeful attempt to explain away lipstick on his collar elicits Holiday's disgusted response: "Take a bath, man; don't explain."

Recording session
Session #52: New York City, November 8, 1944, Decca, Toots Camarata and His Orchestra, with Russ Case (trumpet), Hymie Schertzer, Jack Cressey (alto saxophone), Larry Binyon and Dave Harris (tenor saxophone), Dave Bowman (piano), Carl Kress (guitar), Haig Stephens (bass), George Wettling (drums), Billie Holiday (vocals), and six strings.

Notable cover versions

  
 Helen Merrill (1954)
 George Shearing (1956)
 John Coltrane (1957)
 Abbey Lincoln (1957)
 Charlie Byrd (1958)
 Wes Montgomery (1959)
 Anita O'Day – for her album Trav'lin' Light (1961)
 Dinah Washington – I Wanna Be Loved (1962).
 Dexter Gordon (1962)
 Nina Simone – in her album Let It All Out (1966)
 Carmen McRae – included in her album Woman Talk (1966)
 Lou Rawls (1966)
 Diana Ross – for the album Lady Sings the Blues (1972)
 Grover Washington, Jr. (1973)
 Rosemary Clooney – for her album Here's to My Lady (1978)
 Nikki Sudden & Rowland S. Howard (1987)
 Mary Black (1987)
 Dos (1989)
 Robert Palmer – Don't Explain (1990)
 Dušan Prelević (1991)
 Elkie Brooks  – Round Midnight (1993)
 Natalie Cole – for her album Take a Look (1993)
 Miki Howard (1993)
 Diana Ross (1993)
 Gabrielle Goodman with Kevin Eubanks (1993) 
 Etta James – Mystery Lady: Songs of Billie Holiday (1994)
 Regina Carter (1995)
 Dakota Staton (1996)
 Vanessa Daou (1996)
 Molly Johnson (2000)
 Sarah Vaughan (2001)
 Angela McCluskey (2002)
 Rita Reys (2004)
 Herbie Hancock with Damien Rice and Lisa Hannigan (2005)
 Lisa Stansfield (2005)
 Lils Mackintosh (2005)
 David Clayton-Thomas (2006) (In Concert: A Musical Biography). 
 Inger Marie Gundersen – included in her album "By Myself" (2006)
 Nnenna Freelon (2007)
 Cat Power (2008)
 Oleta Adams (2009) - Let's Stay Here album. 
 DeeDee Bridgewater (2010)
 Beth Hart & Joe Bonamassa (2011)
 Malia (2012)
 Xiu Xiu (2013)
 Mariah Carey (2014)
 Mark Steiner & His Problems (2014)
 Nancy Kelly (2014)
 Cassandra Wilson (2015)
 Rebecca Ferguson – Lady Sings the Blues (2015)
 Snoh Aalegra (2016)

Trivia
Lyrics from "Don't Explain" were sung by Carlo Marx (portrayed by actor Tom Sturridge) in the 2012 film adaptation by Walter Salles of the novel by Jack Kerouac, On the Road, which premiered at the Cannes Film Festival.

References

External links
 Billie Holiday discography
 "Don't Explain" lyrics
 "Don't Explain" at Jazz Standards

1944 songs
1946 singles
Billie Holiday songs
Songs written by Billie Holiday
Songs written by Arthur Herzog Jr.
Torch songs
1940s jazz standards
Songs about infidelity